Monopis spilotella is a moth of the family Tineidae. It was described by Johan Martin Jakob von Tengström in 1848. It is found in Scandinavia, Denmark, the Baltic region,Ukraine, and Russia. It is also found in North America.

The wingspan is 10–19 mm. Adults are on wing from May to September.

References

 "Monopis spilotella (Tengstrom, 1848)". GBIF. Retrieved May 9, 2019.

Moths described in 1848
Moths of Europe
Tineinae